RKE may refer to:

Remote keyless entry system, to unlock a car
Rank Kellner Eyepiece
Roskilde Airport, Copenhagen, Denmark
Rancher Labs Kubernetes Engine, software used in cloud computing